The 2011 Penza Cup was a professional tennis tournament played on hard courts. It was the sixth edition of the tournament which was part of the 2011 ATP Challenger Tour. It took place in Penza, Russia between 18 and 24 July 2011.

ATP entrants

Seeds

 1 Rankings are as of July 11, 2011.

Other entrants
The following players received wildcards into the singles main draw:
  Timur Alshin
  Illia Chkonia
  Anton Manegin
  Vitali Reshetnikov

The following players received entry from the qualifying draw:
  Victor Baluda
  Vitaly Kachanovskiy
  Dmitri Sitak
  Anton Zaytsev

Champions

Singles

 Arnau Brugués Davi def.  Mikhail Kukushkin 4–6, 6–3, 6–2

Doubles

 Arnau Brugués Davi /  Malek Jaziri def.  Sergei Bubka /  Adrián Menéndez 6–7(6–8), 6–2, [10–8]

External links
ITF Search
ATP official site

2011 ATP Challenger Tour
2011
2011 in Russian tennis